The 1934 Drake Bulldogs football team was an American football team that represented Drake University in the Missouri Valley Conference (MVC) during the 1934 college football season. In its second season under head coach Vee Green, the team compiled a 3–6–1 record (2–2 against MVC opponents), tied for third place in the conference, and was outscored by a total of 135 to 59.

Schedule

References

Drake
Drake Bulldogs football seasons
Drake Bulldogs football